Jaime Miguel Linares (born 21 May 1982) is an Angolan footballer who plays for C.R.D. Libolo as a defensive midfielder.

Club career
Born in Vila Real, Portugal to Angolan parents, Linares started playing football for Associação Desportiva e Cultural Escola Diogo Cão, joining S.C. Vila Real at the age of 14 and finishing his youth career with Boavista FC. He made his senior debut with another northern club, Gondomar S.C. of the third division.

In the following four seasons, Linares continued to play in the third level, but also competed in division two with Leça F.C. and A.D. Ovarense. On early morning 16 May 2005 he was involved in a traffic accident with four other players, most notably José Bosingwa and Nélson Marcos, but suffered only minor injuries.

Linares then played in the Algerian Ligue Professionnelle 1 with CA Bordj Bou Arréridj, spending three seasons with the side. Subsequently, he returned to the land of his ancestors and signed for Progresso Associação do Sambizanga.

International career
Linares was part of the Angolan squad at the 2012 Africa Cup of Nations. There, on 22 January, at the age of almost 30, he made his international debut, playing the last seconds of the 2–1 group stage win against Burkina Faso.

References

External links

1982 births
Living people
People from Vila Real, Portugal
Angolan footballers
Association football midfielders
Liga Portugal 2 players
Segunda Divisão players
Boavista F.C. players
Gondomar S.C. players
Leça F.C. players
S.C. Lusitânia players
A.D. Ovarense players
S.C. Dragões Sandinenses players
Algerian Ligue Professionnelle 1 players
CA Bordj Bou Arréridj players
Girabola players
Progresso Associação do Sambizanga players
C.R.D. Libolo players
Angola international footballers
2012 Africa Cup of Nations players
Angolan expatriate footballers
Expatriate footballers in Algeria
Angolan expatriate sportspeople in Algeria